The 2009 Bucknell Bison football team was an American football team that represented Bucknell University during the 2009 NCAA Division I FCS football season. Bucknell tied for second-to-last in the Patriot League.

In their seventh and final year under head coach Tim Landis, the Bison compiled a 4–7 record. Greg Jones, A.J. Kizekai and James Phelan were the team captains.

The Bison were outscored 260 to 162. Bucknell's 2–4 conference record tied with Fordham for fifth in the seven-team Patriot League standings.

Bucknell played its home games at Christy Mathewson–Memorial Stadium on the university campus in Lewisburg, Pennsylvania.

Schedule

References

Bucknell
Bucknell Bison football seasons
Bucknell Bison football